Autogrill is an Italian-based, multinational catering company, which is controlled with a 50.1% stake by the Edizione Holding investment vehicle of the Benetton family. Autogrill runs operations in 30 countries, primarily in Europe and North America, with over 300 licensed and proprietary brands. Over 90% of the company's business derives from outlets in airport terminals and motorway service areas.

History
Autogrill was founded in 1947 when SME, a division of Italian state-owned conglomerate Istituto per la Ricostruzione Industriale (IRI), purchased then merged Italian restaurant groups Motta, Pavesi and Alemagna. Pavesi had begun to operate a service area on the Milan-Novara motorway in 1947, replacing it with a bridge-restaurant accessible by travellers in both directions fifteen years later. Having grown both domestically and through foreign acquisitions, Autogrill was privatised by the Italian Government in 1995 as IRI shed its food and beverage businesses. Edizione Holding, the financial holding company of the Benetton family, acquired a controlling stake through the process.

Edizione floated the company on the Milan Stock Exchange in 1997, sparking a series of acquisitions in overseas markets: by the end of 1998, Autogrill had secured full control of French operator Sogerba (previously owned by Granada Group); AC Restaurants and Hotels of Benelux as well as 14 branches of the Wienerwald chain in Austria and Germany.

Travel Retail and Duty Free business 
In July 1999 the group made its first entry into both the United States and airport concession markets by acquiring Host Marriott Services, which was then renamed HMSHost. Other major acquisitions by the group included the Swiss firm Passaggio (completed in 2001), 70% of high-speed train station operator Receco in 2002, Spanish-based airport duty-free retailer Aldeasa in 2005 (50-50 with Altadis) and Belgium's Carestel (completed in 2007). Autogrill acquired the remaining 50% in Aldeasa for complete control in 2008. It also purchased Alpha Group  and World Duty Free Europe in 2008 and merged them with Aldeasa in 2011 to create World Duty Free Group, a super-retailer at Airports. In 2010, it had €785 million in sales in the United Kingdom and €494 million in sales in Spain.

Demerger to WDF 
On 6 June 2013, Autogrill approved the project of proportional partial demerger whereby Autogrill S.p.A. transferred the Travel Retail and Duty Free business to its wholly owned subsidiary World Duty Free S.p.A. (parent company of World Duty Free Group), the beneficiary, by assigning to the latter the entire shareholding in the Group's Travel Retail and Duty Free business.

On 1 October 2013, World Duty Free has listed on the Borsa Italia in Milan, marking the culmination of the demerger process from parent group Autogrill.

See also 

 Spizzico

References

External links

Companies based in Lombardy
Food and drink companies of Italy
Food and drink companies established in 1947
Restaurants established in 1947
Italian companies established in 1947
Benetton Group